Amal Dutta (4 May 1930 – 10 July 2016) was a former Indian footballer, coach and football manager. Born in Calcutta, then Bengal Presidency, he is considered as the first professional football coach in the country. A finest thinker of the sport, Dutta had a rivalry with Pradip Kumar Banerjee during his coaching days in Kolkata club football.

Known for introducing the "diamond system" in football in India in the late 1970s, Dutta is author of several books including Football Khelte Hole.

Playing career
Dutta made his professional club football debut in the early 1950s, and played for East Bengal in 1953, 1955 and 1956 seasons. During his playing days with both East Bengal and India, he played two of the country's legendary coaches, Bagha Som and Syed Abdul Rahim. In his first season with the club, he was part of the team that toured Romania and participated in World Youth Festival, and Soviet Union in 1953. In that year, the club played against German side Kickers Offenbach and Soviet team Torpedo Moscow.

On 25 October 1953, Dutta made his national team debut against Pakistan in Rangoon during the Quadrangular Series, which was his only appearance for India. Managed by Balaidas Chatterjee, they won the tournament. He was also a member of Indian squad in the 1954 Asian Games in Manila.

Coaching career
After retirement as a player in the early 1960s, he left his job in the Indian Railways to become a full-time coach. He then went to England for a one-year FA coaching course paid for from his own finances, where he was taught by renowned  football administrator Walter Winterbottom, who was first manager of England. Dutta was influenced by Indian coach Sir Dukhiram Majumder.

After returning to India, Dutta started a coaching camp in Bally, Howrah. His first major assignment was to coach Railways in 1960 for the Santosh Trophy, and later managed Odisha twice in the same tournament. Dutta later managed Calcutta Football League club Aryan from 1960 to 1962 and guided players like Asim Moulick. His first assignment with a big club was in 1963 with East Bengal midway through the Calcutta Football League. His first Kolkata Derby match against Mohun Bagan ended in a 3–0 defeat in CFL, and in the return leg, East Bengal bounced back and clinched a 2–0 victory. He remained as coach of East Bengal in 1964 but a year later, after gaining coaching course abroad, the first-ever in India and a feat for which, he received little recognition.

Leaving his job from the Indian Railways to become a full-time coach, was a bold step in the then amateur football scene of the country and it is the reason behind his nickname, the 'first professional coach of India'. In his long coaching career he was associated with premier football clubs of India, and also became coach of India. Dutta coached all the 3 big clubs of the Kolkata Maidan. With East Bengal, he won the CFL (twice), IFA shield (twice), Rovers Cup, Durand Cup, Darjeeling Gold Cup, Bordoloi Trophy, Airlines Gold Cup, Sanjay Gandhi Gold Cup and ATP Shield. He had more success with Mohun Bagan whom he coached to 4 Calcutta Football League titles, 4 IFA Shield titles, 3 Federation Cups, 2 Durand Cups and also wins in DCM Trophy, All Airlines Gold Cup, Sikkim Governor's Gold Cup and Nehru Trophy. In a single season with Mohammedan Sporting in 1980, Dutta won Rovers, DCM and Sikkim Governors Gold Cup titles.

With Mohun Bagan, Dutta won multiple trophies including a "double" in 1969 (IFA Shield and Calcutta Football League). He guided the team clinching Rovers Cup consecutively from 1970 to 1972 while players like Bhabani Roy were flourished under his tenure. After managing the mariners in 1969–1971 and 1985–1987, Dutta returned to the club again in 1989. He then utilized an innovative 3–4–3 "Diamond System", with Abdul Khaliq and Okerie in the front, the club played offensively, which was rare in Indian football. At the 1997 Federation Cup, one of the most anticipated matches in Indian football history, Dutta managed the club against Banerjee's East Bengal in front of the recorded 131,000+ spectators at the Vivekananda Yuba Bharati Krirangan. Despite of a 4–1 defeat, fans lauded Mohun Bagan's impressive style of play under his "Diamond System".

Dutta has also managed another Kolkata-based NFL side Tollygunge Agragami from 1999 to 2000. In September 2006, Dutta was roped in as head coach of Chirag United in place of Belgian manager Philippe De Ridder.

He also managed India national football team and helped them clinching gold at 1987 South Asian Games held in Pakistan. In 1967–68, and 1980–81, he managed Odisha in Santosh Trophy, and also worked as technical director of India while Syed Nayeemuddin was head coach.

Tactics
Dutta was renowned for his bold and innovative tactics and formation, Diamond system. Popularly known as the "Diamond Coach" of Indian football for utilising the 3–4–3 diamond formation, he was one of the key figures who shaped the Kolkata Derby rivalry between Mohun Bagan and East Bengal.

During his early days with the "red and gold brigade" as head coach, he felt that 2–3–5 formation is outdated and wanted to try a three-man defence influenced by the Soviet Union. His proposal to acquire the three-man defence tactic was denied by then East Bengal manager Jyotish Chandra Guha. He brought the iconic Brazilian 4–2–4 system in Mohun Bagan despite opposition from club legends including Sailen Manna, and later used the bold 3–4–3 formation. As chief coach of India, Dutta introduced the 4–4–2 formation at the Football at the 1987 South Asian Games, in which they won gold defeating Nepal. The 3–4–3 diamond formation was popularly used by Johan Cruyff's FC Barcelona. Being a stickler for discipline, Dutta revolutionized football in Kolkata.

Death 
Dutta died on 10 July 2016 at the age of 86. He is survived by a son and a daughter.

Legacy
In July 2016, Utpal Ganguly, president of Indian Football Association, announced that the best coach of every Calcutta Football League season will be awarded with Amal Dutta Trophy, as IFA's tribute to Amal Dutta.

A multipurpose stadium named "Amal Dutta Krirangan" in Dum Dum, North 24 Parganas, was built in honour of Dutta, which was inaugurated by sports and PWD minister Aroop Biswas in March 2020.

Honours

Player

India
Colombo Cup: 1953

East Bengal
Durand Cup: 1956
P. K. Nair Gold Cup: 1956

Manager
East Bengal
IFA Shield: 1965, 1976, 1981, 1983, 1984
Federation Cup: 1978, 1980
Durand Cup: 1978, 1982
Calcutta Football League: 1977, 1982, 1985
Rovers Cup: 1980
DCM Trophy: 1983
Bordoloi Trophy: 1978
Darjeeling Gold Cup: 1976, 1981, 1982, 1985
Stafford Cup: 1981
Sanjay Gandhi Gold Cup: 1984
Trades Cup: 1976
William Younger Cup: 1976

Mohun Bagan
 IFA Shield: 1969
 Rovers Cup: 1970, 1971, 1972, 1985
 Federation Cup: 1986, 1987
 Durand Cup: 1985, 1986
 Calcutta Football League: 1986

India
South Asian Games Gold medal: 1987

Chirag United
Trades Cup: 2007; runner-up: 2006

Individual
 East Bengal "Lifetime Achievement Award": 2014

See also 

 India national football team at the Olympics
 Football at the Asian Games
 List of East Bengal Club coaches
 List of India national football team managers

References

Bibliography

 
 

Bandyopadhyay, Santipriya (1979). Cluber Naam East Bengal . Kolkata: New Bengal Press.
Chattopadhyay, Hariprasad (2017). Mohun Bagan–East Bengal . Kolkata: Parul Prakashan.

External links

1930 births
2016 deaths
Footballers from Kolkata
Indian footballers
India international footballers
Footballers at the 1954 Asian Games
Mohun Bagan AC managers
East Bengal Club managers
India national football team managers
Association football midfielders
Asian Games competitors for India
Indian football managers
Indian football coaches
Tollygunge Agragami FC managers